Punnagai Mannan is a 1986 Indian Tamil-language musical romantic drama film written and directed by K. Balachander. The film stars Kamal Haasan and Revathi, with Srividya, Rekha, Delhi Ganesh, Sudarshan and Sundar Krishna Urs in supporting roles. Its plot revolves around a dance instructor whose student falls in love with him.

Haasan initially pitched to Balachander a sequel to Ek Duuje Ke Liye (1981). The pitched project was not made but Balachander used elements of its plot to make Punnagai Mannan, a separate project. The film was released on 1 November 1986, Diwali day, and ran for over 25 weeks in theatres, becoming a silver jubilee hit.

Plot 
Lovers Sethu and Ranjani arrive at a cliff, where they plan to commit suicide due to opposition to their planned marriage from Ranjani's parents, who rejected Sethu, the son of a drunkard cook, as groom. Ranjani's parents threatened they would kill Sethu or commit suicide. Both Sethu and Ranjani jump from the cliff; Sethu becomes trapped in a tree and survives while Ranjani dies. Despite Ranjani's father's attempts to have Sethu jailed by framing him for having killed Ranjani, there is no evidence to prove it. Sethu is arrested for having attempted suicide.

A year later, Sethu is released. His aunt Padmini, who owns a dance school, provides him a job of dance instructor. Sethu regularly visits the cliff in remembrance of Ranjani. On his way there, he sees a girl who attempts suicide and stops her. He later meets the girl in a gallery; when where she introduces herself as Malini, Sethu ignores her. Malini again meets Sethu at a tourist spot where she photographs him without his knowledge. Sethu realises this and destroys her camera. Malini chases Sethu to his school as his student. Sethu repeatedly insults Malini but she falls in love with him.

Malini coincidentally meets Sethu's uncle "Chaplin" Chellapa, who dresses like Charlie Chaplin, and learns of Sethu's failed relationship, which increases her affection for Sethu. Chellapa helps her to win Sethu's affection. Malini is Sinhalese, because of which she faces trouble from her classmates, from which Sethu rescues her. Though Sethu regularly  humiliates Malini, he begins to like her, and later realises he has started to love her. At the cliff, Sethu takes a sign of blessing from Ranjani for his new love from Ranjani, and confesses his love for Malini and proposes to her.

Malini continues to spend time with Chellapa, whose sense of humour she enjoys. This makes Sethu jealous so he attempts to mimic Chellapa's mannerisms but injures himself. Sethu finds out about Chellapa's own failed relationship, which he tried to forget by wearing a mask of Chaplin. Sethu and Malini unite Chellapa with his former lover Padmini, who never married. Sethu again experiences pressure from Malini's father because Malini is Sinhalese and Sethu is Tamilian. Malini travels from Sri Lanka to Tamil Nadu to join Sethu. Understanding the tight bond between Malini and Sethu, Malini's father approves their marriage.

Ranjani's father hears about Sethu's marriage and wants to take revenge for his daughter's death. On the day of Sethu's engagement, he gives Sethu's father a basket of apples in which a time bomb is placed, pretending it is a gift for his son. Sethu's father places the basket in Chellapa's car, in which Sethu and Malini leave to visit Sethu's cliff. Learning of the bomb's presence, Sethu's father and Chellapa try to stop Sethu and Malini but the explosion kills the couple. Chellapa places flowers on the place of their deaths.

Cast 
 Kamal Haasan as Sethu and "Chaplin" Chellapa
 Revathi as Malini
 Srividya as Padmini
 Rekha as Ranjani
 Delhi Ganesh as Sethu's father
 Sudarshan as Ranjani's father
 Sundar Krishna Urs as Malini's father
 Hussaini as a Sri Lankan Tamil
 Sundar as a dance student

 Baby Kalpana as a little girl in a store

Ramesh Aravind was cast as Malini's lover in flashbacks, but his scenes did not make the final cut.

Production

Development 

After the success of Ek Duuje Ke Liye (1981), its lead actor Kamal Haasan pitched to the director K. Balachander a sequel that would begin from the predecessor's climax but take a detour from the suicides of the lead characters; only the female lead would die and the male's suicide attempt would fail. The sequel was not made but Balachander used these plot elements for a new film titled Punnagai Mannan. Balachander described  Punnagai Mannan as a contrast to Ek Duuje Ke Liye because it "was in response to people who argued why lovers should commit suicide".

Casting and filming 

Haasan was cast in two roles; Sethu, and his uncle "Chaplin" Chellappa. Revathi was cast as Malini, a Sinhalese girl, and her voice was dubbed by Sulakshana. Rekha's character was named Ranjani after the Carnatic raga of the same name. G. M. Sundar made his feature-film debut as a dance student.

Many scenes of Punnagai Mannan were filmed at Athirappilly Falls at Chalakudy, Kerala in 27 days. The film includes a scene in which Haasan and Rekha, who was 16 years old at the time, kiss. In a 2019 interview, Rekha stated she was not told of the kiss before filming the scene. During the filming, Haasan suddenly grabbed and kissed Rekha on her lips. After the shoot, Rekha protested and asked producers to remove the scene but the crew did not comply. Balachander suggested Kala as a dance choreographer to fill in for Raghuram, her brother-in-law who was busy. Suresh Krissna, who worked as an assistant director, said of the picturisation of the song "Mamavukku", Haasan had the novel idea of lip sync being perfect while dance movements are fast. Krissna later used this idea in one of the song sequences in his film Annaamalai (1992). Stills Ravi worked on the production as a stills photographer.

Soundtrack 
Ilaiyaraaja composed the soundtrack for Punnagai Mannan and Vairamuthu wrote the lyrics. A. R. Rahman, who was then known as Dileep, played synthesizer on the soundtrack. Punnagai Mannan was one of the earliest Tamil films in which a sequencer was used. According to Ilaiyaraaja's son Karthik Raja, a Yamaha CX5M system was used around the time of the making of the film. The song "Yedhedho Ennam Valarthen" is set in the raga known as Pahadi; "Singalathu Chinnakuyile" is set in Bageshri; "Enna Satham" is in Sindhu Bhairavi; and "Kavithai Kelungal" is in Savithri.

Vairamuthu praised Balachander for "Enna Satham", stating he had the audacity to insert a song into a sequence in which two lovers were going to die. In May 2015, the FM radio station Radio City commemorated Ilaiyaraaja's 72nd birthday by broadcasting the composer's songs in a special show titled Raja Rajathan for 91 days. "Enna Satham" was one of the most-requested songs on the show. Nandini Ramnath, writing for Scroll.in, described it as a "love song, lullaby and dirge rolled into one".

Release and reception 
Punnagai Mannan was released on 1 November 1986, Diwali day. On 14 November, The Indian Express wrote; "though the film was captivating, it did not seem to have much value as a thing of the past, as memory. And that is because both the plot and character are one-dimensional." Jayamanmadhan of Kalki negatively reviewed the film, particularly the climax, comparing it unfavourably with Balachander's earlier films. Despite competition from other Diwali releases including Maaveeran, Palaivana Rojakkal, Aruvadai Naal, and Kannukku Mai Ezhuthu, Punnagai Mannan became a silver jubilee hit, running for over 25 weeks in theatres. On the film's 25th-week celebrations, Balachander called Haasan Puratchi Mannan (Revolutionary king).

Other versions 
Punnagai Mannan was later dubbed into Telugu as Dance Master and into Hindi as Chacha Charlie.

References

Bibliography

External links 
 

1980s romantic musical films
1980s Tamil-language films
1986 films
1986 romantic drama films
Cultural depictions of Charlie Chaplin
Films directed by K. Balachander
Films scored by Ilaiyaraaja
Films shot in Thrissur
Films with screenplays by K. Balachander
Indian romantic drama films
Indian romantic musical films